Belorechenskoye Urban Settlement is the name of several municipal formations in Russia.

Belorechenskoye Urban Settlement, a municipal formation incorporating the work settlement of Belorechensky and the selo of Malta in Usolsky District of Irkutsk Oblast
Belorechenskoye Urban Settlement, a municipal formation within Belorechensky Municipal District of Krasnodar Krai, incorporating the town of Belorechensk

See also
Belorechensky (disambiguation)

References

Notes

Sources

